United Nations Security Council resolution 860, adopted unanimously on 27 August 1993, after recalling resolutions 668 (1990), 745 (1992), 840 (1993) and other relevant resolutions on Cambodia, the Council confirmed plans for the withdrawal of the United Nations Transitional Authority in Cambodia (UNTAC).

Tributes were paid to the former King Norodom Sihanouk for helping to achieving peace, stability and genuine national reconciliation in the country. The Council recalled that in the Paris Agreements the transitional period would end when the elected Constituent Assembly approved a constitution and transformed itself into a legislative assembly and government. It also noted the request of the Cambodian interim joint administration to maintain UNTAC's mandate until a new government had been formed.

The Council stressed the importance of completing a constitution in accordance with the Paris Agreements, confirming that UNTAC's functions would end upon the creation of a new government in September 1993. It concluded by deciding that the period of withdrawal would end by 15 November 1993, in order to ensure a safe and orderly withdrawal of the military component of UNTAC.

See also
 List of United Nations Security Council Resolutions 801 to 900 (1993–1994)
 Modern Cambodia
 People's Republic of Kampuchea#Transition and State of Cambodia (1989–1992)

References

External links
 
Text of the Resolution at undocs.org

 0860
20th century in Cambodia
Political history of Cambodia
 0860
August 1993 events